David Lesole Dichaba is a South African politician who served as a Member of the Northern Cape Provincial Legislature. He took office as an MPL on 22 May 2019. He was the Chairperson of both the Portfolio Committee on Education, Sport, Arts & Culture and the Standing Committee on Constitutional Affairs, Petitions and Public Participation. Dichaba is a member of the ruling African National Congress (ANC).

Dichaba resigned from the provincial legislature on 6 October 2022.

References

External links
David Lesole Dichaba – People's Assembly
Profile: Mr David Lesole Dichaba – Northern Cape Provincial Legislature

Living people
People from the Northern Cape
South African politicians
Members of the Northern Cape Provincial Legislature
Year of birth missing (living people)